William Gent (19 June 1879 – 7 July 1957) was an Australian rules footballer who played for South Melbourne in the Victorian Football League (VFL).

A rover from Essendon Association, Gent was noted for his bad behaviour on the field. In 1904 he received a 20-game suspension for striking numerous Fitzroy players, while in 1907 he was suspended for life by the league for striking 's Dick L. Harris. His expulsion was lifted on appeal after seven games when it was ruled to be illegal – he had been reported by the Carlton club secretary, rather than by the game's umpire, which was traditionally allowed under VFL rules but turned out no longer to be allowed under the Australasian Football Council rules which had come into effect in 1907. Gent played four more games after return before retiring.

Notes

References
 South Melbourne Team, Melbourne Punch, (Thursday, 4 June 1903), p. 16. 
 Holmesby, Russell and Main, Jim (2007). The Encyclopedia of AFL Footballers. 7th ed. Melbourne: Bas Publishing.

External links

1879 births
Sydney Swans players
Essendon Association Football Club players
1957 deaths
Australian rules footballers from Victoria (Australia)